The grey crowned crane (Balearica regulorum), also known as the African crowned crane, golden crested crane, golden crowned crane, East African crane, East African crowned crane, African crane, Eastern crowned crane, Kavirondo crane, South African crane and crested crane, is a bird in the crane family, Gruidae. It is found in eastern and southern Africa, and is the national bird of Uganda.

Taxonomy
The grey crowned crane is closely related to the black crowned crane, and the two species have sometimes been treated as the same species. The two are separable on the basis of genetic evidence, calls, plumage and bare parts, and all authorities treat them as different species today.

There are two subspecies. The East African B. r. gibbericeps (crested crane) occurs in the east of the Democratic Republic of the Congo and in Uganda, of which it is the national bird represented in its national flag, and Kenya to eastern South Africa. It has a larger area of bare red facial skin above the white patch than the smaller nominate species, B. r. regulorum (South African crowned crane), which breeds from Angola south to South Africa.

Description

The grey crowned crane is about 1 m (3.3 ft) tall, weighs 3.5 kg (7.7 lbs), and has a wingspan of 2 m (6.5 ft). Its body plumage is mainly grey. The wings are predominantly white, but contain feathers with a range of colours, with a distinctive black patch at the very top. The head has a crown of stiff golden feathers. The sides of the face are white, and there is a bright red inflatable throat pouch. The bill is relatively short and grey, and the legs are black. They have long legs for wading through the grasses. The feet are large, yet slender, adapted for balance rather than defence or grasping. The sexes are similar, although males tend to be slightly larger. Young birds are greyer than adults, with a feathered buff face.

This species and the black crowned crane are the only cranes that can roost in trees, because of a long hind toe that can grasp branches. This trait is assumed to be an ancestral trait among the cranes, which has been lost in the other subfamily. Crowned cranes also lack a coiled trachea and have loose plumage compared to the other cranes.

Distribution and habitat

The grey crowned crane occurs in dry savannah in Sub-Saharan Africa, although it nests in somewhat wetter habitats. They can also be found in marshes, cultivated lands and grassy flatlands near rivers and lakes in Uganda and Kenya and as far south as South Africa. This animal does not have set migration patterns, and birds nearer the tropics are typically sedentary. Birds in more arid areas, particularly Namibia, make localised seasonal movements during drier periods.

Behaviour
The grey crowned crane has a breeding display involving dancing, bowing, and jumping. It has a booming call which involves inflation of the red gular sac. It also makes a honking sound quite different from the trumpeting of other crane species. Both sexes dance, and immature birds join the adults. Dancing is an integral part of courtship, but also may be done at any time of the year.

Flocks of 30–150 birds are not uncommon.

Diet and feeding
These cranes are omnivores, eating plants, seeds, grain, insects, frogs, worms, snakes, small fish and the eggs of aquatic animals. Stamping their feet as they walk, they flush out insects which are quickly caught and eaten. The birds also associate with grazing herbivores, benefiting from the ability to grab prey items disturbed by antelopes and gazelles. They spend their entire day looking for food. At night, the crowned crane spends its time in the trees sleeping and resting.

Breeding

Grey crowned cranes time their breeding season around the rains, although the effect varies geographically. In East Africa the species breeds year-round, but most frequently during the drier periods, whereas in Southern Africa the breeding season is timed to coincide with the rains. During the breeding season, pairs of cranes construct a large nest; a platform of grass and other plants in tall wetland vegetation. 

The grey crowned crane lays a clutch of 2-5 glossy, dirty-white eggs, which are incubated by both sexes for 28–31 days. Chicks are precocial, can run as soon as they hatch, and fledge in 56–100 days. Once they are fully grown and independent, chicks of different sexes will separate from their parents to start their own family. Grey crowned cranes have been seen to congregate in large numbers in a ceremony akin to a wedding when two chicks are being married off. The new couple dance for a while before flying off together to start a new family.

Relationship with humans

Status and conservation
Although the grey crowned crane remains common over some of its range, it faces threats to its habitat due to drainage, overgrazing, and pesticide pollution. Their global population is estimated to be between 58,000 and 77,000 individuals. In 2012 it was uplisted from vulnerable to endangered by the IUCN.

Symbolism

The grey crowned crane is the national bird of Uganda and features in the country's flag and coat of arms.  

The crane is seen as the titular bird in The Bird with The Crystral Plumage, though wrongly stated to be Siberian. The bird also appears as an antagonist in Paul Blart: Mall Cop 2, Mr. Bean, and Debbie Does Dallas.

References

External links

 Species text in The Atlas of Southern African Birds
 Grey crowned crane (International Crane Foundation)

 
 

grey crowned crane
National symbols of Uganda
grey crowned crane
Birds of Southern Africa